Rocked and Ripped is the seventh studio album by the American rock band BulletBoys. The album was released August 31, 2011 on Cleopatra Records. The album consists entirely of cover songs. In addition to the 15 cover songs, the album also features a re-recorded version of the band's 1988 hit "Smooth Up In Ya".

Track listing 
Track listing adopted from Discogs:

 Dr. Feelgood (Motley Crue)
 Livin' On a Prayer (Bon Jovi)
 Take Me Home Tonight (Eddie Money)
 Faithfully (Journey)
 Balls To the Wall (Accept)
 Free Fallin' (Tom Petty)
 Renegade (Styx)
 Falling in Love (Scorpions)
 Fuckin' Perfect (Pink)
 The Rover (Led Zeppelin) 
 I'll See You in My Dreams (Giant)
 Colder Weather (Zac Brown Band)
 Rehab (Amy Winehouse)
 Broken Wings (Mr. Mister)
 Tiny Dancer (Elton John)
 Smooth Up in Ya (re-recording)

Personnel 
Marq Torien – vocals, guitar, congas, percussion
Lonnie Vencent – bass
Greg Gatti – guitar
Don "Dish" Bish – drums
Christ Turbis – keyboards

References

2011 albums
BulletBoys albums
Cleopatra Records albums
Covers albums